The Gate of Mecca, Mecca Gate or Makkah Gate, also known as Qur'an Gate, is an arch gateway monumental on the Makkah al-Mukkarramah road of the Jeddah–Makkah Highway. It is the entrance to Mecca, the birthplace of the Islamic prophet Muhammad and signifies the boundary of the haram area of the city of Mecca, where non-Muslims are prohibited to enter.

History 
The Gate was built in 1979. Design was done by Dia Aziz Dia, and architect was Samir Elabd.

Mecca Mayor, Osama bin Fadl al-Bar, acts as Bawabat Makkah Co. Board of Directors Chairman. Complex Bawabat Makkah consists of 5 types of currently developing projects: Governmental Projects, Special Development Projects, Investment Projects, Non-profit Projects, and Funding Projects.

Description 

The gateway is built as an arch over the road, and consists of three main parts:

The main part is structure of Islam's Holy Book – Qur'an, sitting on a rehal (book stand).

Reinforced concrete was used as primary building material; plastic, glass, wood and other materials are also present (e.g. Islamic luminous mosaics/vitrails beneath arches, arched entrances into premises etc.). Whole structure is decorated with various patterns and can get illuminated at night in many different ways.

Under structure there are palm trees planted in line along divide-island, as well as other lower trees and ornamental bushes growing on island around palms and at free land space beside four-laned parkway (divided highway). On its sides there is fine-cut boxwood inside tidy gardens, with shaped and perimeter fences, small parking lots and other auxiliary facilities extending into a big complex.

See also
 Dragon Gate
 Gateway Arch
 Jamaraat Bridge
 Masjid-u-Shajarah
 Holiest sites in Islam
 Memorial gates and arches

References

External links 

  
 SaudiProjects' Entry (saudiprojects.net) 
 Dia's official website (diafinearts.com) 
 Trip Advisor's review (tripadvisor.co.uk) 
 Nadia Masood's description (nadiamasood.com) 

1979 establishments in Saudi Arabia
1979 sculptures
Buildings and structures completed in 1979
Buildings and structures in Mecca
Arches and vaults
Monuments and memorials in Saudi Arabia
Birthplaces of individual people
Islamic holy places
Modernist architecture
Buildings and structures in Jeddah